Frantz Hardy (born January 6, 1985) is a former American football wide receiver. He was undrafted in the 2008 NFL Draft and played college football for the Nebraska Cornhuskers. He was cut on August 22, 2008 from the Philadelphia Eagles due to a leg injury.

Frantz Hardy graduated from Booker T. Washington High School in Miami, Florida in 2003. Obtained a football scholarship at Butler Community College where he received an honor as a Pre Season All-American in the NJCAA Division. After leading the Grizzlies to the National Title game in 2005, he accepted a football scholarship to University of Nebraska with teammate Zac Taylor. Graduating with a Bachelor degree in Social Science, Frantz signed with the Philadelphia Eagles as a Free Agent in the summer of 2008. Frantz is the youngest sibling of six brothers and one sister.

Hardy signed with the Montreal Alouettes of the Canadian Football League on January 14, 2009, but was released at the end of a remarkable pre-season on June 24, 2009.

In 2011 signed a professional contract with the Nebraska Danger.

References

External links 
 Nebraska Cornhuskers bio
 Alouettes bio
 Nebraska Danger bio

1985 births
Living people
Players of American football from Miami
American football wide receivers
Butler Grizzlies football players
Nebraska Cornhuskers football players
Philadelphia Eagles players
Tampa Bay Storm players
Nebraska Danger players
Kansas City Command players